Gillan may refer to:

Places
 Gillan, Cornwall, England
 Gillan, the former Turkish name for Gjilan (Serbian: Gnjilane)

People
 Gillan (1809 cricketer), English cricketer
 Audrey Gillan, journalist
 Cheryl Gillan (1952–2021), Welsh politician
 Chester Gillan (born 1943), Canadian politician
 Felix Gillan (1903–1986), Scottish footballer
 Ian Gillan (born 1945), English musician
 James Angus Gillan (1885–1981), Scottish rower and colonial service official
 James Gillan (actor) (born 1975), British actor
 Jamie Gillan (born 1997), American football player
 Jeff Gillan (born 1957), American journalist
 Karen Gillan (born 1987), Scottish actress
 Kim Gillan (born 1951), Montana politician
 Robert Gillan (died 1879), minister of the Church of Scotland

Other
 Gillan (band), A rock band headed by Deep Purple frontman Ian Gillan in the late seventies and early eighties, selling ten million albums in Europe
 Gillan (album), their debut album

See also
 Gillen (disambiguation)